Michèle Auclair (Paris, 16 November 1924 – Paris, 10 June 2005) was a French violinist and teacher.

Michèle Auclair was born into a family with sense for arts and culture. Her first teacher was Line Talluel and later, at the Conservatoire de Paris, Jules Boucherit, Boris Kamensky and Jacques Thibaud.

In 1943, she won the first prize at the Marguerite Long-Jacques Thibaud Competition and in 1946 also the first prize at Geneva Concours.

From 1956, she collaborated with the pianist Jacqueline Bonneau with their concert debut a year later. In 1962, she started another collaboration with the pianist Geneviève Joy.

In 1967, she was appointed violin professor at the Paris Conservatoire together with Pierre Doukan. In the next two decades, their students won more than 45 international prizes. She also taught at the New England Conservatoire in Boston.

In 1995, she was awarded the Légion d'honneur for her contributions in the field of music.

External links 
 Biography from a CD booklet
 Obituary from The Boston Globe
Michèle Auclair - Profile at The Remington Site

1924 births
2005 deaths
Musicians from Paris
Violin pedagogues
Conservatoire de Paris alumni
Academic staff of the Conservatoire de Paris
Chevaliers of the Légion d'honneur
Long-Thibaud-Crespin Competition prize-winners
20th-century French women classical violinists
Women music educators
Erato Records artists